Mucilaginibacter panaciglaebae is a Gram-negative, strictly aerobic, rod-shaped and non-motile bacterium from the genus of Mucilaginibacter which has been isolated from soil from a ginseng field.

References

Sphingobacteriia
Bacteria described in 2018